Anthony Froshaug (1920–1984) was an English typographer, designer and teacher, born in London to a Norwegian father and English mother.

Influenced by ideas of European modernism, particularly the work of Jan Tschichold, Froshaug is considered by some to be the most convincing exponent of modern typography in Britain.

Anthony Froshaug's archive is located at the University of Brighton Design Archives. A significant collection of Froshaug’s printed ephemera, representing his work between 1945 and 1965 is held at St Bride Library in London. This material originally formed the basis of a retrospective exhibition held at Watford College of Technology in 1965. St Bride Library also has a number of original letterpress formes relating to Froshaug’s work.

Education 
Froshaug attended Charterhouse School and studied book production and wood engraving at the Central School of Arts & Crafts from 1937 to 1939.

Career

Design and typography 
On leaving the Central in 1939 he began to practice as a freelance graphic designer and typographer. As a typographer, he has been viewed as unusual in running his own small (un-private) press, including two periods of printing in Cornwall (1949–52, 1954–7). He worked with Alan Kitching.

Teaching
Froshaug was a natural teacher: he taught typography, first at the Central School (1948–9, 1952–3), then at the Hochschule für Gestaltung Ulm (1957–61), the Royal College of Art in London (1961–4), Watford School of Art (1964–6); in 1970 he returned to teach (part-time) at the Central School, continuing there until illness forced him to stop. He later also taught at the London College of Printing Department of Art and Design from 1980–82.

As both a practitioner and a teacher, Froshaug preferred an experimental workshop environment with opportunities for discussion, rather than more formal learning structures.

He is buried on the eastern side of Highgate Cemetery Carved by Françoise Berserik.

Further reading
Froshaug, Anthony, Typography is a Grid - first published in The Designer, no. 167, January 1967
Kinross, Robin, ed. Anthony Froshaug: Typography & texts/Documents of a life, London: Hyphen Press, 2000
Kinross, Robin, Technics and Ethics: The Work of Anthony Froshaug, Michael Burke, Mark Holt, Simon Johnston, Hamish Muir [Editors]: OCTAVO. JOURNAL OF TYPOGRAPHY 86.1. London: Eight Five Zero, August 1986

References

English typographers and type designers
English graphic designers
1920 births
1984 deaths
Burials at Highgate Cemetery
Schoolteachers from London
People educated at Charterhouse School
Academics of the Royal College of Art
English people of Norwegian descent
Design educators
Alumni of the Central School of Art and Design